Janneke Marlene "Marja" van Bijsterveldt-Vliegenthart (born 27 June 1961) is a Dutch politician of the Christian Democratic Appeal (CDA). She has been mayor of Delft since 2 September 2016.

Early life

Van Bijsterveldt attended nursing school and worked in healthcare.

Politics
In 1990 she became politically active for the Christian Democratic Appeal. She was an alderwoman (member)  of the Almere municipal council but left her post after the mayor of Almere's expenses were investigated. Van Bijsterveldt disagreed with the way the other aldermen of the social-democratic PvdA and the liberal VVD had dealt with the matter, and following a motion of no-confidence she resigned.

In 1994 she was appointed to be Mayor of Schipluiden and at age 33, she became the youngest Mayor in Dutch history. She also was active within the CDA, first as chair of the Christian Democratic Youth Appeal (CDJA), the CDA's youth organization and later as chair of the CDA-women's council. In November 2002 van Bijsterveldt became party chair of the CDA. She was the first chair directly elected by the CDA membership. She beat the other candidate with 26.542 against 9.574 votes. She was reelected for a period of four years in 2006.

On 22 February 2007 Van Bijsterveldt was appointed State secretary for Education, Culture and Science in the fourth Fourth Balkenende cabinet. In August 2009 she made a speech in the States General about Laura Dekker, a thirteen-year-old Dutch citizen whose plans to circumnavigate the world solo caused international controversy. Van Bijsterveldt spoke against Dekker and agreed with the decision to make her a ward of court.

Decorations

References

External links

Official
  J.M. (Marja) van Bijsterveldt-Vliegenthart Parlement & Politiek

 

 

 

 
 

1961 births
Living people
Aldermen in Flevoland
People from Almere
Chairmen of the Christian Democratic Appeal
Christian Democratic Appeal politicians
Dutch nonprofit directors
Dutch nonprofit executives
Dutch nurses
Mayors in South Holland
Members of the House of Representatives (Netherlands)
Ministers of Education of the Netherlands
Officers of the Order of Orange-Nassau
People from Delft
People from Midden-Delfland
Politicians from Rotterdam
Protestant Church Christians from the Netherlands
Reformed Churches Christians from the Netherlands
State Secretaries for Education of the Netherlands
Women mayors of places in the Netherlands
Women government ministers of the Netherlands
20th-century Dutch women politicians
20th-century Dutch politicians
21st-century Dutch women politicians
21st-century Dutch politicians